Bangda Lake, formerly called Yeshil Kul,
is a glacial lake in Ngari Prefecture in the northwest of the Tibet Autonomous Region of China. It lies south of the western Kunlun Mountains, only a few kilometres to the southeast of Guozha Lake (Lake Lighten).
Located at an altitude of 4902 metres, it covers an area of 106 square kilometres with a maximum depth of 21.6 metres and has a drainage basin containing 90 glaciers.

Location 

Yeshil Kul is located along an ancient travel route between Ladakh and Khotan via the Keriya Pass. The route runs along the Longmu Co fault up to Yeshil Kul, and then heads north to the Keriya Pass, after which the valleys of the Iksu, Polu and Keriya rivers are followed.

A "Xinjiang–Tibet Highway" was laid by the People's Republic of China between the Polu town and the vicinity of the Bangda Lake during 1950–1951, prior to its annexation of Tibet. Jeep tracks were then made over the relatively flat, hard terrain of the Longmu Co fault, leading to Rudok. A regular jeep traffic had commenced by 1953.
China has recently constructed a highway that runs along the fault connecting  the G219 and G216 highways.

Maps

Notes

References

Ngari Prefecture
Lakes of Tibet